Kocaelispor is a Turkish football club based in İzmit. They were founded in 1966 and played in the top level between 1980–1988 and 1992–2003. Their best finish was in 1992–93 season, where they finished fourth. They have won the Turkish Cup twice, in 1997 and 2002. On 8 January 2015, in front of 20,152 spectators, Kocaelispor set a record for the highest attendance at a Turkish Regional Amateur League encounter.

History

Foundation
Prior to establishment of Kocaelispor, the Executive board representatives of Baçspor, a local football club, had demanded a new plat from İzmit Municipality to assure a place for training the sports in 1957. Osman Gencal, city mayor at the time, had been interested in finding a place for training due to his sportive background as a former sportsman and a member of Baçspor.

Baçspor had sold the plat for 283,000 Liras and had a new place in Baç district of İzmit; and begun to a new construction. In 1964, Baçspor club board planned to found a new team at professional level and compete in 2nd Division. However, federation regulation of that time was stating that it was required to compound at least 3 teams and have appropriate facilities. Then, in 1966, three teams which are Baçspor, İzmit Gençlik and Doğanspor had come together, combined and founded Kocaelispor. Three club boards had consensus on every subject and embraced the green and black as the club colours. Then, it had been held a club congress in common and the new club board had been elected. Kocaelispor had spent 175,000 Liras to gather their first squad ever to compete in 2nd Division in 1966.

Kocaelispor was promoted to the 1st Division for the first time in 1980. They competed 8 seasons consecutively until their relegation in 1988. However, during this phase, the club has relegated once in 1986–87 season and come back after a Turkish Council of State verdict.

1992–93 season: Legendary roster
After the relegation in 1988, they escaped from relegation to third level in 1990 and Bartınspor relegated. They were back in top-level football campaign of Turkey, 1st Division, in 1992. Following this comeback, Kocaelispor had obtained their best league position performance. The team had a sensational start for the season. Beating Kayserispor with a 7–2 final score in 1st match day, collecting 25 points in first 10 weeks, Kocaelispor ended the first half of the fixture as the league leader. However, team had consecutive defeats and finished the season as the 4th of the ladder of 1992–93 season. The team represented Turkey at UEFA Cup next season.

The manager of team was Güvenç Kurtar and the roster was including respectable players. Fahrudin Omerović was the substitute keeper of Yugoslavia squad. Stevica Kuzmanovski and Mirko Mirković (latterly gained Turkish citizenship with name Mert Meriç) are other Yugoslav players in defence position. Bülent Uygun had played at forward position alongside national striker Saffet Sancaklı. Both players then joined Istanbul clubs. Uygun achieved league top scorer honour while playing for Fenerbahçe and Sancaklı first joined Galatasaray but returned the club in 1995 and at the end of season, he joined Fenerbahçe. Bülent Baturman, Halil İbrahim Kara, Melih Erdem, Ergun Kula are some of other notable players at that squad.

Recent history
Kocaelispor had achieved another successful league position in 1995–96 season as the 5th best team on the table and competed at Intertoto Cup on following season.

Kocaelispor had the Turkish Cup title twice, in 1997 and 2002 against Trabzonspor and Beşiktaş, respectively. On following season of 2002–03, the team has been relegated again as finishing last. After total of 5 seasons competition at TFF First League, Kocaelispor had the championship in 2007–08 season and returned Süper Lig. However, this return lasted one season due to money shortage and relegated again to First League after lost 3–1 home match against Trabzonspor on May 9, 2009 at Round 31 as finishing 17th. Kocaelispor relegated to TFF Second League, third tier of Turkish football once after 2–1 losing away match against Kartalspor on April 4, 2010.

Kocaelispor were managed by 3 managers during 2007–2008 season: Fuat Yaman (from 1st–10th weeks), Kayhan Çubuklu (11th–31st) and Engin İpekoğlu (32nd–34th). They returned to Turkcell Super League as the title holders of last TFF First League season. However, this promotion was followed by successive two relegations and they played TFF Second League once in 2010–11 season. Kocaelispor relegated to fourth level in 2011–12 after finishing last in White Group of Second League. Finally they were relegated to Regional Amateur League after losing 1–0 away match against İstanbulspor 4 rounds before finishing the league on 6 April 2014.

Kocaelispor rivalled with Tekirdağspor, Çengelköyspor and Arnavutköy Belediyespor for promoting to Third League in 2014–15 season. They were leader for some weeks but finished as 4th in 11th group and Tekirdağspor returned professional level after 11 years. Kocaelispor finished 12th Group as champions and faced with Sultangazispor, champions of 11th Group at promotion play-offs. They defeated them as 2–0 with Sinan Pektemek and Hamza Mutlu's goals on 24 April 2016 in Eskişehir and returned professional level after 2 years.

Supporters and rivalries
Kocaelispor boasts a large support base throughout Turkey, particularly in Marmara Region and Black Sea Region. The club's main fan base known as Hodri Meydan.

Stadium
In 2017, İzmit Stadium becomes the new home stadium for Kocaelispor replacing İzmit İsmetpaşa Stadium.

Former sponsors
 Bank Asya (2009–2010)
 Hyundai (2008–2009)

League participations

 Süper Lig: 1980–88, 1992–2003, 2008–09
 TFF First League: 1966–1980, 1988–92, 2003–08, 2009–10, 2021–
 TFF Second League: 2010–12, 2020–21
 TFF Third League: 2012–14, 2016–20
 Turkish Regional Amateur League: 2014–16

Achievements
 Turkish Cup
 Winners (2): 1997, 2002
 TFF First League
 Winners (3): 1980, 1992, 2008 
 TFF Third League
 Winners (1): 2020
 BAL
 Winners (1): 2016

Kocaelispor in Europe

UEFA Cup Winners' Cup:

UEFA Cup/UEFA Europa League:

UEFA Intertoto Cup:

Players

Current squad

Out on loan

Former players

  Kemal Halat

Former managers
  Galip Gündoğdu
  Ergun Ortakçı
  Engin İpekoğlu
  Kayhan Çubuklu
  Fuat Yaman
  Güvenç Kurtar
  Hikmet Karaman
  Mustafa Denizli
  Holger Osieck

References

External links
Official website
Twitter
Kocaelispor on TFF.org

 
Sport in İzmit
Football clubs in Turkey
Association football clubs established in 1966
1966 establishments in Turkey
Süper Lig clubs